Colaspidea inflata is a species of leaf beetle of Algeria, described by Édouard Lefèvre in 1876.

References

Eumolpinae
Beetles of North Africa
Taxa named by Édouard Lefèvre
Beetles described in 1876